Vinchur is a big town in Nashik district, Maharashtra, India. Vinchur is located near to the Lasalgaon City and state highway Nashik to Aurangabad. One of the biggest MIDC is situated in vinchur near nashik city. Nearest Railway station Lasalgaon is only 5 km from Vinchur. Vinchur is known for grape, onion, sugarcane and vegetables the town is also good for residential and industrial area.
Vinchur is primarily known for place of sardar vinchurkar who was one of the pillars of maratha empire. vinchur was capital of sardar vinchurkar with area ranging from yeola to nashik. Sardar vitthalrao vinchurkar was part of battle of panipat (1761) and died in that battle. 
the wada(palace) of vinchurkar is still present in vinchur under very bad stage.

nowadays, vinchur is known for its presence on aurangabad-nashik highway and famous for its grapes and dedicated industrial area for winery. it also known for onion sub market under provision of lasalgaon onion market which is asia's biggest onion market. It is also known for best weather to live in maharashtra.

The primary occupation is agriculture.

A large fort is located in the center of town.

References

External links
Vinchur at India Mapia

Cities and towns in Nashik district